German submarine U-1061 was one of a series of four Type VIIF submarine of Nazi Germany's Kriegsmarine during World War II.

U-1061 was one of four Type VIIF torpedo transport submarines, which could carry 40 torpedoes, and were used to re-supply other U-boats at sea. U-1061 commissioned on 25 August 1943, first served with 5th U-boat Flotilla for training, and later served with 12th U-boat Flotilla.

Design
As one of the four German Type VIIF submarines, U-1061 had a displacement of  when at the surface and  while submerged. She had two shafts and two  propellers.

U-1061 was fitted with five  torpedo tubes (four fitted at the bow and one at the stern), fourteen torpedoes, one  SK C/35 naval gun, 220 rounds, and various anti-aircraft gun. The boat had a complement of between forty-four.

Service history
U-1061 completed five torpedo transport patrols before she surrendered at Bergen, Norway on 9 May 1945, and was later transported to Scotland for Operation Deadlight in which she was sunk on 1 December 1945 by naval gunfire.

References

Bibliography

German Type VIIF submarines
U-boats commissioned in 1943
Operation Deadlight
1943 ships
World War II submarines of Germany
Ships built in Kiel
U-boats sunk in 1945
U-boats sunk by British warships
Ships sunk as targets
U-boats sunk by Polish warships
Maritime incidents in December 1945